Euperipatoides is a genus of ovoviviparous velvet worms in the family Peripatopsidae. All species in this genus have 15 pairs of legs in both sexes. All species are found in New South Wales, Australia. E. rowelli is also found in the Australian Capital Territory.

Species 
The genus contains the following species:

 Euperipatoides kanangrensis Reid, 1996
 Euperipatoides leuckartii (Sänger, 1871)
 Euperipatoides rowelli Reid, 1996

References

External links 
 

Onychophorans of Australasia
Onychophoran genera